The Maine Principals’ Association (MPA) is the governing body for sports competitions among all public and some private high schools in the state of Maine.  It is a member of the National Federation of State High School Associations. The MPA offices are located in Augusta.

History 
First established in 1927 as the State Principals' Association, it became the Maine Principals' Association in 1992 as a result of a merger between the Maine Secondary School Principals' Association (est. 1951) and the Maine Elementary Principals' Association (est. 1975).

Athletic Classifications 
Schools competing under the MPA are grouped into (at most) four classes, with different enrollment cutoffs for each sport (Broken down by season):

Fall

Winter

Spring 

Schools are reclassified every two years.  The classification thresholds are currently being adjusted and would go into effect for the fall 2013 sports season. A school may petition the Association to play in a class above or below its enrollment figure. Currently, most sports are split into "Northern" and" "Southern"  regions.
Championships are played at several locations around the state including Fitzpatrick Stadium (football) and basketball championships between the Cross Insurance Center, Augusta Civic Center), the Portland Exposition Building and the Cumberland County Civic Center depending on class and geographical region.
The MPA using a mathematical system called heal points to determine tournament standings, the latest heal points and an explanation on how to determine the points can be found here.
Currently basketball, soccer, ice hockey, lacrosse and tennis are the only sports to have separate male and female teams, baseball is male only and softball is female only.  Girls ice hockey became a sanctioned sport as of the winter 2008 season.

Other programs
Other activities the MPA also sponsors include debate, drama, National Honor Society, science fair, speech, Student Council, and E-Sports. In addition to interscholastic events, the MPA offers a "Professional Division", which provides opportunities for education and professional advancement for elementary, middle/junior high and high school principals, assistant principals, technical education center directors, assistant directors and other administrators who function primarily as building principals or assistant principals.

External links
 Official site

Organizations based in Maine
Organizations established in 1927
Sports in Maine
High school sports associations in the United States
Education in Maine